The Mameli-class submarine was one of the first classes of the submarines to be built for the  (Royal Italian Navy) after the First World War. Some of these boats played a minor role in the Spanish Civil War of 1936–1939 supporting the Spanish Nationalists. Of the four boats built in this class, all but one survived the Second World War.

Design and description
The Mameli class was one of the 's first classes of submarines to be built after the First World War. They displaced  surfaced and  submerged. Their crew numbered 49 officers and enlisted men.

For surface running, the boats were powered by two  diesel engines, each driving one propeller shaft. When submerged each propeller was driven by a  electric motor. They could reach  on the surface and  underwater.

The boats were armed with six  torpedo tubes, four in the bow and two in the stern for which they carried a total of 10 torpedoes. They were also armed with a single  deck gun forward of the conning tower for combat on the surface. Their anti-aircraft armament consisted of two single  machine guns.

Ships
SOURCES uboat,net Giovanni da Procida (DP) Da Procida Accessed 30 April 2022uboat,net Tito Speri (TS) Speri Accessed 30 April 2022

Service history
Giovanni Da Procida is the only submarine known to have attempted to sink a ship during the Spanish Civil War, albeit unsuccessfully. The Mamelis participated in the Second World War. Three boats survived the war to be discarded in 1948.

Notes

References

External links
 Classe Mameli Marina Militare website

  

Submarine classes
 Mameli
Submarines of the Regia Marina